A significant severe weather and tornado outbreak affected the Southern United States between December 16–17, 2019. Discrete supercells developed in the early morning on December 16 and moved northeast, spawning multiple strong, long-tracked tornadoes in cities such as Alexandria and in Laurel before congealing into an eastward-moving squall line. During the outbreak, the National Weather Service issued several PDS tornado warnings as well as a rare tornado emergency for Alexandria. In addition to this, the Storm Prediction Center issued six tornado watches for the outbreak. The event happened to take place on the same date of another outbreak in a similar area 19 years earlier.

Meteorological synopsis

The first signs of organized severe weather came on December 12, when the Storm Prediction Center (SPC) outlined a day 5 risk area across portions of the Mid-South and lower Ohio River Valley. This 15% delineation area was shifted southwestward the following day and translated to a broad Slight risk for severe weather on December 14. In their first day 2 outlook, the SPC introduced an Enhanced risk across portions of Louisiana, Mississippi, and Alabama. By the late morning of December 16, a Moderate risk area was introduced from eastern Louisiana through central Mississippi.

Expectations of a tornado outbreak arose on December 16 as a well-defined, positively-tilted trough existed across the central United States and very strong cyclonic flow developed southeast of this feature. At the surface, a cold front was expected to progress across the Southeast United States while an intensifying area of low pressure propagated northeast along the boundary. The environment along and ahead of this front was anticipated to be favorable for severe weather, featuring dewpoints as high as the low 70s Fahrenheit, mid-level Convective Available Potential Energy on the order of 1,000–2,000 J/kg, and a  contributing to large hodographs and strong cyclonic updraft potential. In addition, advection of drier air aloft was predicted to inhibit convective development until later in the day. Given the general alignment of the cold front and wind shear aloft, the SPC was uncertain early on December 16 over whether numerous discrete supercells would exist in the highest threat area. By later in the day, however, a consistent signal for sustained warm-sector supercells from available model guidance lent credibility to the potential for multiple significant tornadoes. At 16:40 UTC, the SPC issued their first tornado watch, the first of four during the day as the severe weather threat spread eastward. Discrete supercells soon developed within the warm sector across Louisiana, while a line of thunderstorms congealed along the encroaching cold front. Numerous tornadoes, some strong to intense, were observed across Louisiana and Mississippi throughout the afternoon hours. By late evening, isolated supercells were overtaken by the squall line, reducing the significant tornado threat. The following morning, the storms propagated eastward into Georgia, where a few additional tornadoes occurred before the outbreak came to an end.

Confirmed tornadoes

December 16 event

December 17 event

DeRidder – Rosepine – Alexandria – Pineville, Louisiana

During the afternoon of December 16, a strong, long-tracked and damaging tornado touched down in DeRidder, Louisiana. The tornado was initially weak, causing minor EF0 to EF1 tree and roof damage in DeRidder. The tornado exited DeRidder, widening and strengthening as it continued northeastward into Vernon Parish and reaching EF3 strength as it passed to the southeast of Rosepine. Severe damage occurred along Mac Sterling Road, John Brewer Road, and Borel Road, where a couple of manufactured homes were obliterated with the debris scattered long distances through nearby fields. Outbuildings were destroyed, many large trees were snapped or uprooted, and some frame homes sustained partial to total roof loss. A few of these frame homes sustained collapse of exterior walls as well. A 59-year-old woman was killed in her home by the tornado in this area. The tornado weakened back to EF1 strength as it continued to the northeast, crossing Louisiana Highway 10, where a church lost a portion of its metal roof and outbuildings were destroyed. Numerous trees were snapped as well. EF2 damage occurred beyond this point as the tornado moved through densely forested areas of Fort Polk, snapping and uprooting countless trees. A structure sustained loss of its metal roof and collapse of brick facade in this area as well. Exiting Fort Polk, the tornado narrowed and weakened again, causing EF0 to EF1 tree damage is it moved through unpopulated areas. Additional minor EF0 and EF1 tree damage occurred as the tornado continued into Rapides Parish, moving to the northeast as it passed near Hineston and Otis. Restrengthening then occurred as extensive EF2 tree damage occurred near the Kincaid Reservoir. Numerous trees were snapped and denuded, and a few sustained some low-end debarking.

Maintaining EF2 strength, the strong tornado then entered the west side of Alexandria. Numerous mobile homes were thrown and destroyed at a mobile home sales business along Ross Lane, while nearby homes sustained significant roof damage. A few outbuildings were destroyed as well. The tornado strengthened and widened further just past this location, producing EF3 damage along Stovall Road. Several large metal buildings were completely destroyed in this area, and a large portion of the nearby Hope Baptist School was destroyed at EF3 intensity as well, with large amounts of debris scattered throughout the area. The tornado then crossed Louisiana Highway 28 and heavily damaged Johnny Downs sports complex along the north side of the highway. Continuing to the east-northeast, additional EF3 damage occurred as a convenience store was destroyed, and a nearby large metal-framed warehouse building was destroyed as well along John Allison Drive. A manufactured home was overturned in this area as well. In a nearby residential area, the tornado weakened to EF2 strength as large trees were downed, and homes had large portions of their roofs torn off. Continuing to the northeast through Alexandria, the tornado narrowed and weakened to EF1 strength, damaging trees and power poles as it crossed Bayou Rapides Road. Along Enterprise Road, a warehouse building sustained EF1 damage to its roof and doors. The tornado proceeded to cross the Red River and entered Pineville, first causing EF1 damage to structures at the Pineville Municipal Airport. The tornado moved along a northeasterly path through residential areas of Pineville, snapping and uprooting numerous large trees. Some of these trees fell onto houses and caused heavy damage. A majority of the damage in Pineville was rated EF1, though a small pocket of EF2 damage occurred along Edgewood Drive, where a house sustained considerable structural damage. Past this area, the tornado continued to narrow and weaken, eventually dissipating after producing some EF0 tree limb damage along Donahue Ferry Road in Pineville.

Overall, this EF3 tornado caused one fatality along its 62-mile long path.

Laurel – Sandersville – Shubuta – Mannassa, Mississippi/Lisman, Alabama

This strong, long-tracked tornado touched down during the late evening hours of December 16, at Hesler Noble Field in southwestern Laurel, Mississippi. Past the airport, the tornado caused EF0 to EF1 damage at the Dixie Golf Club, where trees and tree limbs were snapped and fencing was blown over. The tornado moved along a northeastward path through the southwest side of Laurel, downing trees and causing minor roof damage to homes. Metal roofing was torn off of a three-story motel along Jefferson street as well. Damage along this section of the path was rated EF0 to EF1 in intensity. Crossing South 16th Avenue, the tornado reached EF2 strength, where a small brick office building sustained roof and exterior wall loss, and a strip mall was heavily damaged. The roof of a hotel was lifted up and dropped back down onto the building, and a semi-truck and flatbed trailer carrying automobiles was flipped over and dragged. Continuing to the northeast through Laurel, the tornado weakened back to EF1 strength as numerous homes, warehouses, apartment buildings, and other structures sustained minor to moderate roof damage. One large building lost a substantial portion of its metal roof, and sustained collapse of brick facade. A Piggly Wiggly grocery store also sustained minor EF0 roof and exterior damage in this area as well, and numerous trees and a few power poles were downed. The tornado continued to the northeast through residential neighborhoods at EF1 intensity, snapping and uprooting trees and causing roof damage to additional homes. Some trees fell onto houses and cars as well. A metal self-storage building was partially destroyed along North 1st Avenue, and a large warehouse building near North Railroad Avenue sustained considerable roof damage. The tornado reached EF2 intensity again as moved through the eastern part of Laurel, where a house had its roof torn off and other homes sustained lesser roof damage. The Nora Davis Magnet school also lost much of its roof in this area.

The tornado then reached low-end EF3 intensity as it exited Laurel and crossed Interstate 59, snapping and uprooting numerous trees, and toppling several large metal truss transmission towers to the ground. Low-end EF3 damage continued as the tornado then completely destroyed the Wade Services manufacturing plant, along with several other metal buildings and an office building on the property. Northeast of this area, the tornado momentarily weakened and caused EF1 tree damage as it moved along the east side of Interstate 59. The tornado became strong again as it then impacted the southern fringes of Sandersville at EF2 strength, where a house sustained loss of much of its roof, along with some second floor exterior walls. Another home sustained major roof damage, outbuildings were damaged or destroyed, numerous large trees were snapped or uprooted, and two people sustained minor injuries in the Sandersville area. Past Sandersville, the tornado weakened back to EF1 strength as it struck the Mississippi Choctaw Reservation, where homes sustained roof and garage damage, a small pavilion collapsed, trees were downed, and headstones were tipped over at a cemetery. EF0 and EF1 damage to trees and homes continued through the extreme northwestern corner of Wayne County and into the southwestern corner of Clarke County, though a small pocket of EF2 damage occurred along County Road 223, where numerous large trees were snapped and a mobile home was rolled and destroyed. Additional EF2 damage occurred as the tornado crossed US 45 north of Shubuta, where a well-built home had most if its roof torn off. Northeast of Shubuta, numerous trees were snapped and uprooted at EF1 strength as the tornado moved through rural areas. A few outbuildings and mobile homes were damaged as well. A final area of EF2 damage occurred to the southwest of the small community of Mannassa, where a well-built home along County Road 664 sustained destruction of its attached garage, and had a large portion of its roof torn off. A nearby mobile home was rolled and destroyed as well. Northeast of Mannassa, the tornado weakened to EF0 strength as it approached the Alabama border, causing only tree limb damage in rural areas. The tornado then regained EF1 strength as it crossed into Choctaw County, Alabama, downing trees and destroying a mobile home. Additional trees were snapped or uprooted, and a house sustained partial removal of its roof before the tornado dissipated to the west-northwest of Lisman, Alabama after traveling .

The tornado was on the ground for 1.5 hours and was rated low-end EF3 and injured two people.

See also

 List of North American tornadoes and tornado outbreaks

Notes

References

Tornadoes in Alabama
2019 in Alabama
Tornadoes in Louisiana
2019 in Louisiana
Tornadoes in Mississippi
2019 in Mississippi
December 2019 events in the United States
2019 natural disasters in the United States
Tornadoes of 2019
F3 tornadoes